Requiem of the Apocalypse is the fourth album by Runemagick. It was released in 2002 on Aftermath Music

Track listing
  "Preludium"   – 1:01  
  "Temple of Skin"   – 6:37  
  "Beyond Life"   – 5:11  
  "On Chariots to Hades"   – 6:49  
  "Dawn of the Lava Aeon"   – 4:18  
  "One Road to Megiddo"   – 4:55  
  "Bells of Death"   – 2:02  
  "Funeral Caravan"   – 6:54  
  "Fields of No Life"   – 4:31  
  "Memorandum Melancholia"   – 8:13  
  "The Secret Alliance"   – 3:37  
  "Requiem of the Apocalypse"   – 5:47  
  "Landscape of Souls"   – 2:41

Credits
 Nicklas "Terror" Rudolfsson - Vocals, Guitar
 Emma Karlsson - Bass
 Daniel Moilanen - Drums 
 Fredrik Johnsson - Guitar

Runemagick albums
2002 albums